Turbo reevei, common name the Reeve's turban, is a species of sea snail, marine gastropod mollusk in the family Turbinidae.

Description
The length of the shell varies between 32 mm and 100 mm. The color pattern of the shell is deep or reddish brown, clouded and minutely flecked with white. The peristome is white. The columella contains a heavy callus. It differs from Turbo petholatus in the more obscure, marbled color pattern.

Distribution
This marine species occurs in the Indian Ocean off the Mascarene Basin; off the Philippines, Indonesia, Japan and Vietnam; in the South China Sea.

References

 Alf A. & Kreipl K. (2003). A Conchological Iconography: The Family Turbinidae, Subfamily Turbininae, Genus Turbo. Conchbooks, Hackenheim Germany.

External links
 Gastropods.com: Turbo (Turbo) reevii [sic]

reevei
Gastropods described in 1847
Taxa named by Rodolfo Amando Philippi